Gebran Andraos Tueni, also written Tueini, born to a Greek Orthodox Christian family in Lebanon and who died in Santiago, Chile in 1948, was a famous Lebanese journalist and a figure of the Arab Renaissance. Because of his political views, he lived in exile for a while in Paris.

Biography
Returning to Beirut, he founded the Lebanese newspaper Al Ahrar and in 1933, An Nahar daily newspaper that became the largest circulation daily in Lebanon.

The paper that started on August 4, 1933 as a 4-page tabloid was published by Gebran Tueni as its editor-in-chief and he continued at the head of the influential newspaper until his sudden death in 1948, when editing was taken over by his son Ghassan Tueni, also a prominent journalist, politician, ambassador, and later on Lebanese government minister who continued until 1999.

His grandson Gebran Tueni, the son of Ghassan Tueni, who was named after him became the editor-in-chief of An Nahar after Ghassan Tueni's retirement. The grandson Gebran was also a prominent Lebanese journalist who was elected as a Member of Parliament in Lebanon in 2005, and a fierce critic of the Syrian government and its policies in Lebanon and a figure of March 14 Alliance leading to his assassination on 12 December 2005.

References

20th-century Lebanese writers
1890 births
1948 deaths
Lebanese journalists
Greek Orthodox Christians from Lebanon
Eastern Orthodox Christians from Lebanon
Gebran